Rrëshen is a small town and a former municipality in Lezhë County, in northern Albania.

History
At the 2015 local government reform, Rrëshen became a subdivision and the seat of the municipality Mirditë. It was the administrative seat of the former Mirditë District. The population at the 2011 census was 8,803.

The City
As an administrative seat, the town has schools and a hospital. After the Communist era, new facilities such as a hotel, a restaurant, and a cultural centre appeared in the area. The trunk route from the Kosovar border to Tirana and Durrës passes on each side of Rrëshen, providing good communications with the capital and the Adriatic. Before the Second World War, the city was classed as a small village, but administrative changes and an increase in the mining industry boosted the city's status. However, since the fall of Communism, most of the mines have become disused. This has resulted in mass migration to Tirana and larger, more industrial centres.

Religion
Its cathedral, Katedralja e Jezusi i Vetmi Shpëtimtar i Botës, is the episcopal see of the Roman Catholic Diocese of Rrëshen, which was created in 1996 by promoting the Territorial Abbacy of Shën Llezhri i Oroshit from Territorial Abbey to a bishopric. It is a suffragan diocese in the province of the Metropolitan Roman Catholic Archdiocese of Tiranë–Durrës.

Mirdita Gallery

Notable people

 Eugent Bushpepa (born 1984), singer and songwriter
 Musine Kokalari (born 1917), Albanian writer and political activist
Albion Marku (born 2000) Footballer
Edison Ndreca (born 1994) Footballer
Fatmir Vata (born 1979) Footballer

References

Sources and external links
 Rrëshen Municipality
 Mirdita Tourism Portal
 Albanian Census Figures
 GigaCatholic

 
Former municipalities in Lezhë County
Administrative units of Mirditë
Towns in Albania